Čakova is a settlement in the Municipality of Sveti Jurij ob Ščavnici in northeastern Slovenia.

Location

It lies on the regional road leading north out of Sveti Jurij towards Spodnji Ivanjci.

History
The area is part of the traditional Styria region. It is now included with the rest of the municipality in the Mura Statistical Region.

References

External links
Čakova at Geopedia

Populated places in the Municipality of Sveti Jurij ob Ščavnici